Luke Harlen (born 28 April 1984) is an Australian former professional rugby league footballer. He previously played for the Cronulla Sharks, North Queensland and the Wests Tigers in the National Rugby League. He played as a prop-forward.

Background
Harlen was born in Townsville, Queensland, Australia.

Career
Harlen made his debut for the Cronulla Sharks in 2006.

Although contracted to the Wests Tigers for the 2008 season he did not play in the first-grade team. Harlen was released mid-season to play for the Northern Pride in the Queensland Cup competition.

He made his debut for the North Queensland Cowboys against the Brisbane Broncos in Round 19, 2008 after being called up from the Northern Pride in the Queensland Cup competition. He returned to the Cronulla Sharks in 2010 and played a further 3 more NRL Games.

After being unsigned by the Cronulla Sharks in 2010, Harlen returned to the QLD Cup with the Northern Pride. Harlen represented the QLD residents side in 2011 after strong performances with the Northern Pride. In 2012 the Nth QLD Cowboys signed the front rower on a one-year deal. Harlen retired midway through the 2012 season due to an ongoing knee injury.

Career highlights 
First Grade Debut: 2006 - Round 3, Cronulla vs Manly-Warringah Sea Eagles at Brookvale Oval, 25 March

References

External links 
Cronulla Sharks profile
Luke Harlen at NRL Stats

1984 births
Living people
Australian rugby league players
Cronulla-Sutherland Sharks players
Rugby league props
North Queensland Cowboys players
Balmain Ryde-Eastwood Tigers players
People educated at Kirwan State High School
Northern Pride RLFC players
Rugby league players from Townsville